The .224 Valkyrie (5.6×41 mm) cartridge is a .22 caliber (5.6 mm) rimless bottlenecked intermediate rifle cartridge, developed by Federal Premium Ammunition to rival the performance of the .22 Nosler, while still being compatible with modern sporting rifles (MSRs).

See also 
 5 mm caliber
 List of AR platform cartridges

References

External links 
 What is the New 224 Valkyrie Round?
 New 224 Valkyrie Cartridge Debuts at 2018 Shot Show
 The Keefe Report: 224 Valkyrie Rightly the Next Big Thing
 Everything You Need to Know about Federal Premium's 224 Valkyrie
 224 Valkyrie Ballistics and Reloading
 Exclusive First Look: Federal's 90-Grain Fusion in 224 Valkyrie

Pistol and rifle cartridges
Weapons and ammunition introduced in 2017